Andrew Smith (born 27 July 1962) is a British screenwriter, playwright and author, best known for his work with the BBC science fiction television series Doctor Who.

Career
At seventeen-years-old, Smith achieved his ambition to write for Doctor Who with Full Circle, the third serial of the 18th season. Working titles for this story included The Planet That Slept. It broadcast in four weekly parts on BBC1 from 25 October to 15 November 1980. A novelisation of this serial, written by Smith, was published by Target Books in September 1982.

After limited success in television, Smith left the industry and joined the police. Decades later, he would return to Doctor Who, becoming a regular writer for Big Finish Productions. In addition to Doctor Who, Smith's other audio dramas would include Survivors, based on the 1970s BBC television series; Star Cops, based on the cult 1987 TV series created by Chris Boucher, and their Originals boxset, Transference, starring Alex Kingston.

Credits

Television
Full Circle

Big Finish

Doctor Who main range
 The Brood of Erys
 Mistfall
 The Star Men
 Hour of the Cybermen
 Emissary of the Daleks

Lost Stories
 The First Sontarans

Fourth Doctor Adventures
 The Movellan Grave
 The Sons of Kaldor
 The Sinestran Kill
 The Quest of the Engineer

Classic Doctors, New Monsters
 The Sontaran Ordeal

The War Doctor
 The Eternity Cage
 The Lady of Obsidian

The First Doctor Adventures
 The Barbarians and the Samurai
 Return to Skaro

Early Adventures
 Domain of the Voord

Third Doctor Adventures
 Storm of the Horofax

Destiny of the Doctor
 Vengeance of the Stones

Companion Chronicles
 The Invasion of E-Space

Short Trips
 Flashpoint

UNIT: The New Series
 Earthfall (Extinction)
 Bridgehead (Extinction)
 Death in Geneva (Shutdown)
 The Battle of the Tower (Shutdown)
 The Sontaran Project (Encounters)

The Robots
 Toos and Poul

Survivors
 Judges
 Rescue
 The Second Coming
 Come the Horsemen
 Lockup
 Conflict

Blake's 7
 Battleground
 The Liberator Chronicles Vol.10: Retribution
 The Liberator Chronicles Vol.11: Escape From Destiny

Star Cops
 One of Our Cops is Missing
 Hostage
 The New World

Big Finish Originals
 Transference

Timeslip
 Volume 1: The Age of the Death Lottery

Space 1999
 Goldilocks

References

External links
 

Living people
21st-century British male writers
British television writers
British male screenwriters
British science fiction writers
Scottish television writers
Scottish dramatists and playwrights
British male television writers
1962 births